H5N1 flu

See :
 Influenza A virus subtype H5N1    
 Influenza_vaccine#H5N1
 H5N1 clinical trials
 Transmission and infection of H5N1